Anderson Nocetti (born 5 March 1974 in Florianópolis), nicknamed Macarrão, is a Brazilian Olympic rower. At the 2012 Summer Olympics, he reached the quarter finals in the men's single sculls event.

References

External links 
 
 
 

1974 births
Living people
Sportspeople from Florianópolis
Brazilian male rowers
Rowers at the 2000 Summer Olympics
Rowers at the 2004 Summer Olympics
Rowers at the 2008 Summer Olympics
Rowers at the 2012 Summer Olympics
Olympic rowers of Brazil
Rowers at the 2011 Pan American Games
Rowers at the 2007 Pan American Games
Pan American Games medalists in rowing
Pan American Games silver medalists for Brazil
Pan American Games bronze medalists for Brazil
Medalists at the 2007 Pan American Games